TransJakarta Corridors are routes operated under the TransJakarta bus rapid transit system branding. In 2019, TransJakarta served 264.6 million passengers an increase of 40 percent from the year before. The first corridor was opened in 2004, with twelve new corridors following in the years after. Due to the notable traffic jams in the Jabodetabek area, the operational hours of both Transjakarta and KRL Jabodetabek have been steadily extended, especially since Jokowi became governor. Later on, Ahok and Anies Baswedan each made improvements to the TransJakarta system by funding for additional vehicles and opening new feeder lines.

TransJakarta currently operates 13 BRT corridors, utilising dedicated bus lanes which are closed to normal vehicles. TransJakarta has the longest BRT network in the world, with the main corridor length totaling 230.9 kilometres. In addition to the BRT corridors, Transjakarta also operate 36 cross corridor routes, 68 inner city feeder routes, 14 cross border feeder routes, 13 premium service routes, 22 low cost rental apartment feeder routes, 9 free tour routes and 69 Mikrotrans (angkot feeder) routes. The cross-corridor and feeder services are capable of using the dedicated corridors for a length of the route, however they also operate as a standard public bus service using normal road lanes, partly due to some buses (such as the Metrotrans branded buses) lacking the raised doors for use at the BRT stations and the inability to reserve lanes through more established areas.

All Transjakarta services operate from 05.00 to 23.00 from Sunday to Thursday, while Friday and Saturday services operate until 24.00. Amari (angkutan malam hari or night transport) and andini (angkutan dini hari or early morning transport) operate in all main corridors aside from corridors 4, 7, 11 and 12, which only operate on normal hours. Amari and andini only stop at the selected stations. Though it is branded a bus rapid transit system, some new lines lack dedicated lanes and the touted frequent service levels, for example, the Corridor 2 extension into Bekasi city (the first line to extend past the city limit).

In December 2015, the Institute for Transportation and Development Policy (ITDP) announced that 6 corridors out of the then 12 corridors won bronze category in the international standards. There are 4 standard categories, being Basic Bus Rapid Transit (BRT), Bronze BRT, Silver BRT and Gold BRT. The six corridors to achieve the category were corridor 1 (Blok M-Kota), corridor 2 (Harmoni-Pulogadung), corridor 3 (Harmoni-Kalideres), corridor 5 (Ancol-Kampung Melayu), corridor 6 (Ragunan-Dukuh Atas), and corridor 9 (Pluit-Pinang Ranti).

Main Corridors
TransJakarta serves 13 operational main corridors with 2 more planned. All main corridors uses high BRT stops and the bus stops at all shelters in a corridor. The first corridor began operation at February 2004. The latest, Corridor 13, started operation in August 2017.

Stations marked in italic are temporarily closed/skipped until further notice due to various upgrading works or new planned stations.

Corridor 1

 Began operation: February 1, 2004
 Operator: PT. Transportasi Jakarta, Perum PPD, PT. Mayasari Bakti & PT. Steady Safe Tbk
 Route length: 
 Number of stations: 20
 Buses type and color: Zhongtong Bus in blue-white and red-yellow, Scania in blue-white and dark blue-white, Mercedes Benz in blue-white, pink-white and vintage scheme, Volvo in dark blue-white & Hino in dark blue-white

Note:

  *) Semanggi to Bendungan Hilir bus stop via skywalk bridge which is maybe too steep for disable person and takes at least 10 minutes walk
 Stations indicated by a <- sign has a one way service towards Blok M from Kota. Stations indicated by a -> sign has a one way service towards Kota from Blok M.Currently, all bus stops are served by buses 24 hours a day

Corridor 2

 Began operation: January 15, 2006
 Operator: PT. Transportasi Jakarta, PT. Pahala Kencana, PT. Steady Safe Tbk, Perum PPD & Perum DAMRI
 Route length: 
 Number of stations: 24
 Buses type and color: Scania in blue-white, Mercedes Benz in dark blue-white, Volvo in dark blue-white, Hino in dark blue & Zhongtong in red-yellow and blue-white

On May 19, 2014, the route was extended 7.61 kilometers from Pulo Gadung to Ujung Menteng in Bekasi. It is the first TransJakarta corridor to cross the border of the DKI Jakarta area (please differentiate with Angkutan Perbatasan Terintegrasi Busway/APTB at below). The new bus stops are Raya Bekasi KIP, Raya Bekasi Tipar Cakung, Cakung United Tractors, Raya Bekasi Pasar Cakung, Raya Bekasi Cakung Cilincing, Raya Bekasi Pulo Gebang, and Raya Bekasi Ujung Menteng. At the original time of opening, 4 bus stops in Harapan Indah Estate, 2 in Estate entrance and 2 near Family Market (one for each direction) were not yet ready, however (at the end of May 2014), they were completed and the route was extended to Harapan Indah.

Note: 

 Stations indicated by a <- sign has a one way service towards Senen from Monumen Nasional. The bus then continues to Galur. Stations indicated by a -> sign has a one way service towards Monumen Nasional from Senen. The bus then terminates there.
 Currently, all bus stops are served by buses 24 hours a day
 During construction of MRT Jakarta, Corridor 2 doesn't serve Harmoni

Note: *Bermis only serves corridor 2B towards Harapan Indah
Stops of corridor 2B listed here are the high floor BRT stops, feeder stops are not include in this list.

Corridor 3

 Began operation: January 15, 2006 (24 hours operation a day on selected stations from June 1, 2014)
 Operator: PT. Transportasi Jakarta, Perum PPD, PT. Mayasari Bakti & PT Steady Safe Tbk
 Route length: 
 Number of stations: 16
 Buses type and color: Scania in blue-white and dark blue-white, Mercedes Benz in dark blue-white, Volvo in dark blue-white, Hino in blue & Zhongtong Bus in blue-white

Note: All stations are served by buses 24 hours a day

Corridor 4

 Began operation: January 27, 2007
 Operator: Perum PPD, PT. Mayarsari Bakti & PT. Transportasi Jakarta
 Route length: 
 Number of stations: 17
 Buses type and color: Hino in blue & Mercedes Benz in dark blue-white

Corridor 5

 Began operation: January 27, 2007
 Operator: PT. Transportasi Jakarta, Perum DAMRI & Perum PPD
 Route length: 
 Number of stations: 18
 Buses type and color: Hino in blue, Zhongtong Bus in red-yellow and blue-white, Yutong Bus in red-yellow & Ankai Bus in red-yellow

 Note : 

 Pasar Jatinegara 1 serves as terminus temporarily from 16 February 2023 until the completion of renovated Kampung Melayu BRT station
 Salemba Carolus only serves Corridor 5E towards Kampung Rambutan
 Kampung Melayu only serves Corridor 5C towards Harmoni and 5D towards Ancol
 Station indicated by a -> sign has a one way service towards Kampung Melayu
 Currently, all bus stops are served by buses 24 hours a day. Night corridor M5 extends the line to PGC 2 following corridor 7's route.

Corridor 6

 Began operation: January 27, 2007
 Operator: PT. Transportasi Jakarta, PT. Mayasari Bakti & Perum PPD
 Route length: 
 Number of stations: 20
 Buses type and color: Hino in blue and dark blue-white, Mercedes-Benz in blue-white and dark blue-white & Scania Bus in blue-white and dark blue-white

Note: 

 Stations indicated by a -> sign has a one way service towards Dukuh Atas 2. 
 During Dukuh Atas LRT station construction, the corridor temporarily terminates at Halimun
 Currently, all bus stops are served by buses 24 hours a day. Night corridor M6 extends the line to Harmoni following corridor 6A/1's route

Corridor 7

 Began operation: January 27, 2007
 Operator: PT. Transportasi Jakarta, Perum PPD & PT. Mayasari Bakti
 Route length: 
 Number of stations: 14
 Buses type and color: Hino in blue, Mercedes Benz in blue-white & Scania Bus in dark blue-white

From October 23, 2017, a toll/express route operates between Kampung Rambutan and Kampung Melayu during the morning peak hours of 05.00-09.00. The toll/express route uses the toll road to avoid traffic jams in the regular corridor. From Kampung Rambutan, the route turns towards Tanah Merdeka and enters the toll road, exiting at Cawang UKI-Cawang BNN-Cawang Otista-Gelangang Remaja-Bidara Cina-Kampung Melayu.

Note : 

 Cawang BNN only serves Corridor 9A towards Grogol/Pluit
 Kampung Melayu only serves Corridor 5C towards Harmoni and Corridor 5D towards Ancol 
 Pasar Jatinegara will serve as terminus temporarily from 7 January 2023 until the completion of renovated Kampung Melayu BRT station
 Currently, all bus stops are served by buses 24 hours a day, served by M7 from Kp. Rambutan up to BNN and M5 for the rest of the line.

Corridor 8

 Began operation: February 21, 2009
 Operator: Perum DAMRI, PT. Mayasari Bakti, PT. Steady Safe Tbk & Perum PPD
 Route length: 
 Number of stations: 22
 Buses type and color: Zhongtong Bus in red-yellow and blue-white, Scania in blue-white and dark blue-white, Volvo in dark blue-white & Hino in blue

Note: 

 Station indicated by a -> sign has a one-way service towards Pasar Baru
 Currently, all bus stops are served by buses 24 hours a day.

Note: 

 Route temporarily not in operation due to MRT Jakarta project and its role being replaced by rerouted corridor 8
 Station indicated by a <- sign has a one way service towards Grogol 2
 Currently, all bus stops are served by buses 24 hours a day.

Corridor 9

 Began operation: December 31, 2010 (24 hours operation a day on selected stations from June 1, 2014)
 Operator: PT. Transportasi Jakarta, Perum PPD, PT. Mayasari Bakti, PT. Steady Safe Tbk & Perum DAMRI
 Route length: 
 Number of stations: 27
 Buses type and color: Scania in blue-white and dark blue-white, Mercedes-Benz in dark blue-white, blue-white and pink-white (female only bus), Zhongtong Bus in red-yellow and blue-white, Hino in blue, Volvo in dark blue-white, Yutong Bus in red-yellow & Ankai Bus in red-yellow

Note: 

 *) Bendungan Hilir to Semanggi bus stop via skywalk bridge which is maybe too steep for disable person and takes at least 10 minutes walk.
 Currently, all bus stops are served by buses 24 hours a day.

Corridor 10

 Began operation: December 31, 2010
 Operator: PT. Transportasi Jakarta, Perum PPD, PT. Mayasari Bakti, PT. Pahala Kencana & PT. Steady Safe Tbk
 Route length: 
 Number of stations: 22
 Buses type and color: Scania in dark blue-white and blue-white, Yutong in red-yellow, Hino in blue, Mercedes-Benz in dark blue-white & Volvo in dark blue-white

From October 23, 2017, a toll/express route operates from PGC towards Tanjung Priok during the peak hours of 06.00-10.00 and 16.00-20.00. Thee toll/express routes use the toll road to avoid traffic jams in the regular corridor. The bus enters the toll road after Penas Kalimalang and then exits the toll road prior to the Plumpang Pertamina bus stop, then continues through regular corridor towards Tanjung Priok.

The toll/express route from Tanjung Priok towards PGC also operates during 06.00-10.00 and 16.00-20.00. From Tanjung Priok, the bus enters the toll road after Sunter Kelapa Gading and exits the toll road before Penas Kalimalang, then continues through regular corridor stops towards PGC.

A bypass route between Cililitan and Dukuh Atas also operates between 06.00 and 09.00. Bypass routes use other corridor(s) to avoid traffic jams in regular corridor. Corridor 10 uses the normal corridor to Cawang UKI-Pemuda Pramuka BPKP and then turns to corridor 4 to Dukuh Atas.

Note: 
 Currently, all bus stops are served by buses 24 hours a day. 
 Station indicated by a <- sign has a one way service towards Tanjung Priok

Corridor 11

 Began operation: December 31, 2010
 Operator: Perum PPD & PT. Steady Safe Tbk
 Route length: 
 Number of stations: 16
 Buses type and color: Hino in blue & Volvo in dark blue-white

Note: 

 Station indicated by a -> sign has a one way service towards Matraman 1
 Corridor 11 will be temporarily extended to Matraman 1 (disembark only)/Tegalan from 7 January 2023 until the completion of renovated Kampung Melayu BRT station
 Currently, bus stops from Pulogebang to Flyover Klender are served by buses 24 hours a day. Night corridor M11 diverge from its daytime counterpart by turning north from Flyover Klender toward Pulogadung

Note: 

 Station indicated by a <- sign has a one way service towardsPulo Gebang
 Route temporarily not in operation

Corridor 12

 Began operation: February 14, 2013
 Operator: Perum PPD & PT. Steady Safe Tbk
 Route length: 
 Number of stations: 14
 Buses type and color: Hino in blue & Volvo in dark blue-white

Note:

 Stations indicated by a -> sign has a one way service only towards Tanjung Priok Stations indicated by a <- sign has a one way service only towards Pluit
 Currently, all bus stops are served by buses 24 hours a day.

Corridor 13

Corridor 13 is the first Transjakarta corridor to operate on a primarily elevated route, running via a 9 kilometre long, 8 metre wide, dedicated bus bridge, with height ranging from 18 to 23 metres above ground level. A trial of the bridge operated on May 15, 2017. The route soft launched on August 14, 2017, with official operation starting 2 days later. The two main route variations are the Transjakarta Regular route, operating all stops for a 20-minute end-to-end journey, and the Transjakarta Express route, stopping only at CSW and Velbak stations, taking 10 minutes end-to-end.

Operating Routes

 Corridor 13: Ciledug - Tendean, 24 hours (branded Corridor M13 from 22:00 - 05:00 with reduced fleets). 
 Corridor 13B: Puri Beta 2 - Pancoran Barat, 05:00 - 22:00
 Corridor 13C: Puri Beta 2 - Dukuh Atas, 05:00 - 22:00
 Corridor 13D: Puri Beta 2 - Ragunan, 05:00 - 22:00  (only operates on weekend and public holidays) 
 Corridor L13E: Puri Beta 2 - Halimun via Kuningan (Express Route), 05:00 - 22:00  (only operates on weekdays, not operating on public holidays)
Non-Operating Routes
 Corridor 13A: Puri Beta 2 - Blok M, 05:00 - 22:00 (closed)
 Corridor 13E: Puri Beta 2 - Halimun via Kuningan, 05:00 - 22:00  (closed, replaced with L13) 
 Corridor 13F: Puri Beta 2 - Kampung Melayu, 05:00 - 22:00 (closed)

Currently, the buses stop at Puri Beta 2, Puri Beta 1, Adam Malik, and Tendean at ground level and at JORR, Swadarma, Cipulir, Seskoal, Kebayoran Lama, Mayestik, CSW 1 and Tirtayasa stations along the elevated busway.

On November 12, 2018, PT. Transjakarta opened a new bus stop at CBD Ciledug. The extension of Corridor 13 to CBD Ciledug was slated to enhance the connectivity of public transport in the Greater Jakarta area. Due to the completion of Cakra Selaras Wahana (CSW) transit hub, TransJakarta decided to terminate the operation corridors 13A and 13B from 22 February 2022 onwards, while corridor 13C no longer serves several stations in corridor 1.

 Began soft operation: August 14, 2017
 Operator: PT. Transportasi Jakarta
 Route length: 
 Number of stations: 14
 Buses type and color: Mercedes Benz in blue-white, dark blue-white and vintage scheme

Note: 

 Stations indicated by a -> sign has a one way service only towards Tendean
 Currently, all bus stops are served by buses 24 hours a day.

Future Corridors
In the past, Transjakarta has slated the development of two future corridors, likely taking the same approach as Corridor 13 and operating via an elevated busway. These future corridors include:
 Corridor  (Jakarta International Stadium - Senen)
 Corridor  (Jakarta International Stadium - Pulo Gebang)
 Corridor 16 (Kampung Melayu - Harmoni via Jl. Layang Satrio)
 Corridor 17 (Stasiun Kota - Tanjung Priok via Ancol)
 Corridor 18 (Puri Kembangan - Pluit via PIK)
 Corridor 19 (Manggarai - Terminal Depok via Margonda)
Initially, corridor 14 would serve the route between Manggarai and UI (currently serviced by 4B feeder bus). In March 2022, Jakarta Government announced that Corridor 14 would instead serve the route between Atrium (Senen) to Jakarta International Stadium. The Transportation Agency (Dishub) announced the shelters used by this corridor on March 11, 2022, without mentioning specific details about route taken to pass the stations. It would be built as a BRT corridor, but Transjakarta operated the route temporarily as feeder. The corridor would meet 3 existing corridors (2, 5 and 12). As a consequence, it was expected that the route would be at-grade

Cross-Route Corridors
As well as the regular corridors, Transjakarta Busway operates cross-route corridors (also called express-corridors or union-corridors, aiming at narrowing the headway of some corridors). As at April 2020, the corridors include:
 Corridor  Rawa Buaya - Pulo Gadung
 Corridor  Kalideres - ASMI, no stop at Harmoni Terminal
 Corridor 3F Kalideres - Gelora Bung Karno
 Corridor 3H Jelambar - Kota
 Corridor 4C TU Gas - Bundaran Senayan (only on weekdays)
 Corridor   Pulo Gadung - Patra Kuningan (only on weekdays)
 Corridor 4H Pulo Gadung - Ragunan (only on weekends and holiday) 
 Corridor 4K Pulo Gadung - Blok M
 Corridor 4M Pulo Gadung - Kota
 Corridor  PGC - Harmoni
 Corridor  PGC - Ancol
 Corridor  Kampung Rambutan - Ancol
 Corridor 5H Harmoni - Ancol
 Corridor 5K Kampung Melayu - Kota
 Corridor  Ragunan - Monas via Kuningan
 Corridor  Ragunan - Monas via Semanggi, previously Kopaja S.602
 Corridor 7F Kampung Rambutan - Harmoni via Cempaka Putih
 Corridor 7M Kampung Rambutan - Pulo Gadung via Pemuda
 Corridor  Grogol - Harmoni via Tomang
 Corridor  PGC - Grogol/Pluit
 Corridor  Pinang Ranti - Kota (only on weekdays)
 Corridor  Pinang Ranti - Bundaran Senayan
 Corridor 9K Kampung Rambutan - Grogol (via Jagorawi Toll Road and Jakarta Inner Toll Ring Road) (only on weekdays)
 Corridor 9M Pinang Ranti - Kuningan (only on weekdays)
 Corridor 10D Kampung Rambutan - Tanjung Priuk (via Jagorawi Toll Road and Jakarta Inner Toll Ring Road) (only on weekdays)
 Corridor 10H Tanjung Priok - Blok M
 Corridor 11V Pulo Gebang - Pasar Baru
 Corridor 12M Sunter Boulevard Barat - Harmoni
 Corridor 13A Blok M - CBD Ciledug
 Corridor 13B Pancoran Barat - Ciledug Puri Beta
 Corridor 13C Ciledug Puri Beta - Dukuh Atas
 Corridor 13D Ragunan - Ciledug Puri Beta
 Corridor 13E Ciledug Puri Beta - Kuningan (only on weekdays)
 Corridor 13F Ciledug Puri Beta - Kampung Melayu

In late October 2017, TransJakarta launched 6 alternative cross-corridor and express routes to alleviate the additional traffic caused by infrastructure projects preparing for the 2018 Asian Games in Jakarta and Palembang. The routes are :
 Corridor L4 PGC 2 - Dukuh Atas 2
 Corridor L7 Kampung Melayu - Kampung Rambutan via TMII Toll Road
 Corridor L10 PGC 2 - Tanjung Priok via Toll Road

Note: L2 has since been withdrawn since the travel time was not as expected
L10A and L10B was merged into L10 with 2 directions

Feeder routes

In cooperation with other bus operators, TransJakarta has two feeder bus networks that continue on the ordinary roads beyond the exclusive bus lanes. There are two services, one known as  'City Bus Integration with TransJakarta Bus' (Bus Kota Terintegrasi Bus TransJakarta or BKTB) and the other 'Integrated Border Transit Busway' (Angkutan Perbatasan Terintegrasi Busway or APTB). Since August 1, 2014 TransJakarta stations no longer sell non-TransJakarta tickets and feeder bus passengers must buy a TransJakarta ticket to enter the stations and also pay for a ticket inside the feeder buses.

Inner City Feeder
Previously Bus Kota Terintegrasi Busway/BKTB (Busway Integrated City Bus), the inner city feeder bus network serves for middle to upper-economy passengers in certain satellite districts in Jakarta. Outside the dedicated TransJakarta busway lanes, passengers can board these buses using standard bus stops without the need for raised platforms. These routes were mainly operated by Kopaja, however since the introduction of a new Transjakarta low-entry bus fleet, operating under the name Metrotrans, the routes can be operated by any appointed Transjakarta contractor. Some routes are also operated by special buses with both kerb-level entry and busway-level entry, either operated by Kopaja with their buses under the Transjakarta brand, or by a specialised Transjakarta fleet operating under the name Minitrans.

Pantai Indah Kapuk-Monas BKTB is integrated with Corridor 1 (Blok M-Kota) and Corridor 12 (Pluit-Tanjung Priok). Starting on January 4, 2016, all 6 BKTB buses will be replaced by 20 mid-size buses likes Kopaja buses with the tariff is decreased to Rp 3,500 (from Rp 6,000 previously) same as other TransJakarta Regular buses tariff. The route is also extended to Pantai Indah Kapuk-Waduk Pluit-Monas-Governor Office (Balai Kota). Kalibata-Tanah Abang BKTB is integrated with Corridor 1 and Corridor 9 (Pluit-Pinang Ranti).
The routes that are served are :
 Corridor 1A Pantai Indah Kapuk - Monas
 Corridor 1C Blok M - Bintaro Kodam via Ciledug Raya 
 Corridor 1E Blok M - Pondok Labu, operating alongside Metromini S.610
 Corridor 1M Blok M - North Meruya
 Corridor 1P Senen - Blok M
 Corridor 1Q Blok M - Rempoa
 Corridor 2K Jakarta Garden City (JGC) - Harapan Indah
 Corridor 3D Penjaringan - Rawa Buaya
 Corridor 3E Puri Kembangan - Sentraland Taman Palem
 Corridor 4A TU Gas - Jelambar, previously PPD P.210\
 Corridor 4C Bundaran Senayan - TU Gas
 Corridor 4F Pulo Gadung - Pondok Gede - Pinang Ranti
 Corridor 5A Kampung Melayu - Grogol, previously PPD P.213
 Corridor 5F Kampung Melayu - Casablanca - Tanah Abang
 Corridor 5M Kampung Melayu - Cikini - Tanah Abang
 Corridor 5N Kampung Melayu - Pancoran - Ragunan Belakang
 Corridor 6H Lebak Bulus - Senen, operating alongside Kopaja P.20
 Corridor 6N Blok M - Ragunan via Pangeran Antasari - Kemang - Ampera
 Corridor 6Q Epicentrum - Casablanca
 Corridor 6R Ragunan - Lebak Bulus - Ragunan
 Corridor 7A Lebak Bulus - Kampung Rambutan
 Corridor 7B Kampung Rambutan - Blok M
 Corridor 7D Kampung Rambutan - Pancoran Tugu
 Corridor 7E Kampung Rambutan - Ragunan
 Corridor 7N Kampung Rambutan - Pasar Rebo - Gandaria
 Corridor 7P Pondok Kelapa - BKN
 Corridor 8D Blok M - Joglo
 Corridor 8E Blok M - Bintaro Raya Sector 1
 Corridor 8K Batusari - Tanah Abang
 Corridor 9D Pasar Minggu - Tanah Abang, operating alongside MetroMini S.640
 Corridor 9E Kebayoran Lama - Grogol
 Corridor 9H Blok M - Cipedak via Pasar Minggu Street
 Corridor 10C Tanjung Priok - Tanjung Priok Port
 Corridor 11A Pulo Gebang - Rawamangun
 Corridor 11D Pulo Gadung - Pulo Gebang via Jalan Raya Bekasi - Perkampungan Industri Kecil (PIK) – Jalan Sentra Primer Timur
 Corridor 11Q Kampung Melayu - Pulo Gebang via East Flood Canal (Banjir Kanal Timur)
 Corridor 12A Kota - Kaliadem
 Corridor 12B Pluit - Senen
 Corridor 12E History of Jakarta Explorer 
 Corridor 12K Asemka Explorer

Cross border feeder

The cross-border feeders were initially launched on August 24, 2015, with routes from Ciputat-Blok M (launched on October 1, 2014, a TransJabodetabek route through Pondok Indah, while as an APTB route through Fatmawati.), Harapan Indah Bekasi-Pasar Baru, and Poris Plawad Tangerang-Kemayoran. The buses were provided with a smartcard validator, a passenger counter and a GPS.

On April 25, 2016, TransJakarta launched 3 new corridors from Bekasi to Jakarta vice versa with ticket only Rp 3,500. There were Bekasi MM-Bundaran HI, Bekasi MM-Tanjung Priok, and Bekasi Timur-Grogol. And starting on May 16, 2016, Bekasi Timur-Pasar Baru corridor is launched. On August 10, 2016, routes to Bekasi MM are extended to Summarecon Bekasi.

On May 26, 2016, TransJakarta launched 2 new corridors from 10 corridors planned from Tangerang to Jakarta vice versa with ticket only Rp 3,500. There were Poris Plawad Terminal-Senayan Circle and Poris Plawad Terminal-Pasar Baru.

On June 6, 2016, TransJakarta launched 2 new corridors from Ciputat-Bundaran HI will integrates with Corridor 1 (Kota-Blok M), Corridor 8 (Lebak Bulus-Harmoni Sentral) and corridor 9 (Pluit-Pinang Ranti). While the other new corridor BSD City-Slipi will integrates with Corridor 8A (Lebak Bulus-Grogol 2) and Corridor 9 (Pluit-Pinang Ranti).

On June 20, 2016, TransJakarta launched a new corridor from Terminal Margonda (Depok) to Cawang UKI vice versa with a cost of only Rp 3,500. The route through Margonda Raya, Juanda, Tol Cijago, and exit at Cililitan and then end at Cawang UKI bus stop. But starting on July 19, 2016, TransJakarta is also (only) pass Cibubur toll gate. The bus stop from Depok is Cibubur Buperta and the bus stop from Cawang is Cibubur Junction.

The cross-border feeder network was previously known as Transjabodetabek, however buses servicing theses routes have been rebranded to Transjakarta, as Transjabodetabek now refers to buses servicing the Jabodetabek area and are not integrated to TransJakarta BRT services. It refers to a premium bus service, sometimes has a similar look to TransJakarta buses.

The routes are :
 Corridor 2B Harapan Indah - ASMI
 Corridor 7C Cibubur - BKN
 B11 Summarecon Bekasi - Bundaran HI
 B12 Summarecon Bekasi - Tanjung Priok
 B21 Bekasi Timur - Grogol
 B22 Bekasi Timur - Juanda
 B31 Pulo Gebang - Harapan Indah
 T11 Poris Plawad - Bundaran Senayan
 T12 Poris Plawad - Juanda
 S11 Bumi Serpong Damai (BSD) - Jelambar
 S21 Ciputat - CSW 
 S22 Ciputat - Kampung Rambutan
 S41 Pondok Cabe - Tanah Abang
 D11 Depok Bus Terminal - BKN 
 D21 Univeritas Indonesia (UI) - Lebak Bulus

Nb:- Routes B11 and B12 will be cut to Summarecon Bekasi-Cawang UKI from 10.00 to 15.00 every day.
- Routes B21 and B22 will be cut to Bekasi Timur-Cawang UKI from 10.00 to 15.00 every day.

Royaltrans Feeder
TransJakarta's premium service, Royaltrans, began operation on March 12, 2018. Royaltrans is operated by PT Transportasi Jakarta (TransJakarta) with Mercedes-Benz OH917 buses with special fittings including coach-style seats and personal adjustable air-conditioner vents. This service is related with the odd-even policy in the Jakarta-Cikampek toll road. The routes are :
 1K Cibubur - Blok M
 1T Cibubur - Kota
 1U TMII - Balai Kota
 6P Cibubur - Kuningan
 B13 Bekasi Barat - Blok M
 B14 Bekasi Barat - Setia Budi Utara AINI (Kuningan)
 B15 Jatibening - Blok M
 B16 Jatibening - Kuningan
 B23 Bekasi Timur - Manggarai (Tebet)
 B24 Bekasi Timur - Kalideres
 S12 Bumi Serpong Damai(BSD) - Fatmawati
 S31 Bintaro - Blok M
 D31 Cinere - Kuningan
 D32 CInere - Bundaran Senayan

PRJ Event Feeder
June 7, 2017, TransJakarta added more buses to serve the JiExpo-Monas route, together with the opening of Pekan Raya Jakarta(PRJ). The aim is to serve passengers going to and from PRJ, which will increase during the event. 3 more routes were also added to accommodate passengers from other directions. The routes that are served are :
 Corridor 2C JiExpo - Monas
 Corridor PRJ2 JiExpo - Kampung Melayu
 Corridor PRJ3 JiExpo - PGC
 Corridor PRJ4 JiExpo - Pulogadung

Rental Apartment TransJakarta Feeder
The feeder is for low-class income people of Rental Apartment (Rusunawa). With the ID Card for adult or KJP (Kartu Jakarta Pintar) for student, the service is free, but not for the accompanying person. The first feeder is Tanjung Priok - Rusunawa Marunda has been operated starting on January 17, 2016, while the other 9 feeders will be launched soon connecting Rusunawa Daan Mogot, Rusunawa Tambora, Rusunawa Kapuk Muara, Rusunawa Flamboyan, Rusunawa Cipinang Besar Selatan, Rusunawa Buddha Tzu Chi, Rusunawa Pulogebang, Rusunawa Pinus Elok, and Rusunawa Rawa Bebek.
Routes that are currently available are:
 Corridor 1D Karang Anyar Rental Apartment - Olimo (CLOSED)
 Corridor 2E Rawa Bebek Rental Apartment - Pakin
 Corridor 2F West Cakung Rental Apartment(Albo) - Pulo Gadung
 Corridor 2H Jati Rawasari Rental Apartment - Senen
 Corridor 3A Pesakih Rental Apartment - Kalideres
 Corridor 3B Flamboyan Rental Apartment - Kalideres
 Corridor 3C Kapuk Muara Rental Apartment - Kalideres
 Corridor 4E Jatinegara Kaum Rental Apartment - Pulogadung
 Corridor 9F Tambora Rental Apartment - Pluit
 Corridor 10A Marunda Rental Apartment - Tanjung Priok
 Corridor 10B Cipinang Besar Selatan Rental Apartment - Penas Kalimalang
 Corridor 11B Rawa Bebek Rental Apartment - Penggilingan
 Corridor 11C Pinus Elok Rental Apartment - Rusun Pulo Gebang
 Corridor 11K Komarudin Rental Apartment - Penggilingan
 Corridor 11M Rawa Bebek Rental Apartment - Bukit Duri
 Corridor 11N Cipinang Muara Rental Apartment - Jatinegara
 Corridor 11P Pondok Bambu Rental Apartment - Radin Inten
 Corridor 11R Cakung Km2 Rental Apartment - Bukit Duri
 Corridor 12C Waduk Pluit Rental Apartment - Penjaringan
 Corridor 12D Sukapura Rental Apartment - Sunter
 Corridor 12F Marunda Rental Apartment - Waduk Pluit Rental Apartment
 Corridor 12H Penjaringan Rental Apartment - Penjaringan

Train Station Feeder
The Train Station Feeder network was launched on April 4, 2016, with four routes from Tebet train station connecting 3 TransJakarta corridors. 
Routes to corridor 6 operate through Saharjo flyover, Casablanca, Rasuna Said and Dr. Satrio, then turn back besides Sampoerna Strategic Square to return to Tebet Station. Routes to corridors 5 and 7 operate through Kampung Melayu, connecting to corridor 5, then through Jalan Jatinegara Barat, turning around to Kebon Pala and heading to Jalan Jatinegara Timur, Kampung Melayu Terminal, then passing through corridor 7 and heading to Jalan Otista. It will then turn back at Bidara Cina to return to Tebet Station. There is no permanent Tebet bus station as of January 2020, so buses start and terminate under Tebet flyover. Starting on April 14, 2016, Train Station Feeder services operate from Pesing railway station to Indosiar.
The available feeder routes are :
 Corridor 1B Palmerah Station - Bundaran HI
 Corridor 1F Palmerah Station - Bundaran Senayan
 Corridor 1H Tanah Abang Station - Gondangdia Station
 Corridor 1N Tanah Abang Station - Blok M, operating alongside Kopaja P.19
 Corridor 1R Tanah Abang Station - Senen Station 
 Corridor 2P Gondangdia Station - Senen
 Corridor 2Q Gondangdia Station - Balai Kota
 Corridor 4B Manggarai Station - Universitas Indonesia(UI)
 Corridor 5B Tebet Station - Bidara Cina
 Corridor 6C Tebet Station - Karet via Patra Kuningan
 Corridor 6D Tebet Station - Karet via Underpass
 Corridor 6E Tebet Station - Karet via Rasuna Said
 Corridor 6F Manggarai Station - Ragunan
 Corridor 6M Manggarai Station - Blok M
 Corridor 7D Cawang Station - TMII
 Corridor 8C Tanah Abang Station - Pasar Kebayoran Lama 
 Corridor 10F LRT Station Kelapa Gading - Sunter Kelapa Gading
 Corridor 11T Cakung Station - Pulo Gebang via Jakarta Outer Ring Road
 Corridor 11U Cakung Station - Pulo Gebang via Cakung Cilincing
 Corridor DA1 Dukuh Atas TOD - Sam Ratulangi
 Corridor DA2 Dukuh Atas TOD - Tanah Abang
 Corridor DA3 Dukuh Atas TOD - Kuningan
 Corridor DA4 Dukuh Atas TOD - Kota

MRT Feeder
The MRT Feeder network connects suburbs, places of interest and Park and Ride locations with Jakarta MRT stations, using MiniTrans buses with 32 seats. The services operate with frequent 5 minute headways. The following is a list of routes as of January 2020:
 Corridor MR1 CSW - Pakubuwono
 Corridor MR2 CSW - Kramat Pela
 Corridor MR3 CSW - Wijaya
 Corridor MR5 Blok A MRT Station - Radio Dalam
 Corridor MR8 Blok A MRT Station - Antasari
 Corridor MR9 Fatmawati MRT Station - South Quarter

Mikro Trans Feeder
The Jak Lingko integration program is a program that aims to integrate all transportation modes in Jakarta, including the Angkot operators, that have been integrated under the Transjakarta brand. The integrated angkot service is known as Mikrotrans. The concept is that travelling with TransJakarta services aside from Royal Trans under 3 hours will only cost a maximum of Rp 5,000. All Mikrotrans units are equipped with a smartcard reader, accepting only Jak Lingko cards.

Since the opening of the Tanah Abang Skywalk, 8 Mikrotrans routes serve an interchange underneath the Skywalk.

Currently Jak Lingko serves numerous routes. The active routes are :
 JAK 001 Tanjung Priok - Plumpang
 JAK 002 Kampung Melayu - Duren Sawit
 JAK 003 Lebak Bulus - Pondok Labu
 JAK 004 Grogol - Tubagus Angke
 JAK 005 Semper - Rorotan
 JAK 006 Kampung Rambutan - Pondok Gede
 JAK 007 Tawakal - Tanah Abang
 JAK 008 Roxy - Bendungan Hilir
 JAK 009 Rox Mas - Karet
 JAK 010 Tanah Abang - Kota
 JAK 010A Gondangdia Station - Cikini
 JAK 011 Tanah Abang - Kebayoran Lama
 JAK 012 Tanah Abang - Kebayoran Lama via Pos Pengumben
 JAK 013 Tanah Abang - Kota via Jembatan Lima
 JAK 014 Tanah Abang - Meruya Ilir
 JAK 015 Tanjung Priok - Bulak Turi
 JAK 016 PGC - Condet
 JAK 017 Pulo Gadung - Senen
 JAK 018 Stasiun Duren Kalibata - Kuningan
 JAK 019 Pinang Ranti - Setu
 JAK 020 Lubang Buaya - Cawang UKI
 JAK 021 PGC - Dwikora
 JAK 022 Penas Kalimalang - Dwikora
 JAK 024 Pulo Gadung - Senen via Kelapa Gading
 JAK 025 Kalisari - Pasar Rebo
 JAK 026 Duren Sawit - Rawamangun
 JAK 027 Rorotan - Pulogebang
 JAK 028 Pasar Rebo - Taman Wiladatika
 JAK 029 Tanjung Priok - Rusun Sukapura
 JAK 030 Citraland - Meruya
 JAK 031 Pondok Labu - Blok M
 JAK 032 Petukangan - Lebak Bulus
 JAK 033 Pulogadung - Kota
 JAK 034 Rawamangun - Klender
 JAK 035 Rawamangun - Pangkal Jati
 JAK 036 Cilangkap - Cililitan
 JAK 037 Cililitan - Condet
 JAK 038 Bulak Ringin - Kampung Rambutan
 JAK 039 Duren Sawit - Kalimalang
 JAK 040 Grogol - Tubagus Angke
 JAK 041 Kampung Melayu - Pulogadung
 JAK 042 Kampung Melayu - Pondok Kelapa
 JAK 043 Tongtek Bukit Duri - Cililitan via Kalibata
 JAK 044 Pulogebang - Taman Harapan Baru
 JAK 045 Ragunan - Lebak Bulus
 JAK 046 Pasar Minggu - Jagakarsa
 JAK 047 Pasar Minggu Terminal - Ciganjur
 JAK 049 Lebak Bulus - Cipulir
 JAK 050 Kalideres - Puri Kembangan
 JAK 051 Taman Kota - Budi Luhur
 JAK 052 Kalideres - Muara Angke
 JAK 053 Grogol - Pos Pengumben
 JAK 054 Grogol - Benhil
 JAK 056 Grogol - Srengseng
 JAK 058 Cilincing - Rorotan
 JAK 059 Rawamangun - Rawa Sengon
 JAK 060 Kelapa Gading - Rusun Kemayoran
 JAK 061 Pulomas - Cempaka Putih
 JAK 064 Lenteng Agung - Aselih
 JAK 071 Pinang Ranti - Kampung Rambutan via Kampung Dukuh
 JAK 072 Kampung Rambutan - Pasar Rebo
 JAK 073 Jambore Cibubur - Pasar Rebo
 JAK 074 Rawamangun - Cipinang Muara
 JAK 075 Kampung Pulo - Halim
 JAK 077 Tanjung Priok - Jembatan Hitam
 JAK 080 Rawa Buaya - Rawa Kompeni
 JAK 084 Kampung Melayu - Kapin Raya
 JAK 085 Bintara - Cipinang Indah
 JAK 088 Tanjung Priok - Ancol Barat
 JAK 112 Pulogadung - Tanah Merah
 JAK 117 Terminal Tanjung Priok - Terminal Tanah Merdeka

Free Service routes
In 2016, TransJakarta launched a free bus service serving Harmoni to Bundaran Senayan. This route does not operate within the dedicated lanes, instead going through the main road from Harmoni-Thamrin-Sudirman and back. The aim is to drop off and pick up workers that can't go through Thamrin and Sudirman roads as an impact of the odd-even rule.
On December 21, 2017, PT. Transportasi Jakarta launched a new free bus service, operating as a feeder to get around the suburb of Tanah Abang.

There are currently 3 free bus routes, being:
 GR1 Harmoni - Bundaran Senayan
 GR2 Tanah Abang Explorer
 POLDA Shelter Feeder

Nb: GR is short for 'gratis,' Indonesian for 'free.'

Free double decker tour services

TransJakarta serves 6 free routes using double decker buses. These routes are intended to be routes to promote Jakarta's tour sites. The was sourced from the government touting CSR (Corporate Social Responsibility) from :

 Jakarta Government (5 units)
 PT. Coca-Cola Indonesia (1 unit)
 Tahir Foundation (5 units)
 PT. Sumber Alfaria Trijaya (1 unit)
 Tower Bersama Group (1 unit)
 CIMB Niaga (3 units)
 Dulux/Akzo Nobel (2 units)
 Artha Graha (4 units)
 Agung Sedayu Group (4 units)
 PT. Nestle Indonesia (1 unit)

All CSR's liveries has been removed, but the disctitive colors still be seen.

With a fleet totaling 27 buses, the routes serviced are :
 BW1 - History of Jakarta (Juanda - Monas 2 - Monas 3 - IRTI - Balai Kota - Museum Nasional  - Gedung Arsip Nasional - Museum Bank Indonesia - BNI 46 - Pasar Baru - Juanda)
 BW2 - Jakarta Modern (Juanda - Monas 1 - Monas 3 - IRTI - Balai Kota - Sarinah - Museum Nasional - SD Santa Maria - Pasar Baru - Juanda)
 BW3 - Art & Culinary (Balai Kota - Sarinah - Plaza Indonesia - Harmoni - Gedung Arsip Nasional - Museum Bank Indonesia - BNI 46 - Sawah Besar - SD Santa Maria - Juanda - Monas 2 - IRTI - Balai Kota)
 BW4 - Jakarta Skyscraper (Juanda - Monas 1 - Monas 3 - IRTI - Balai Kota - Sarinah - Tosari - Dukuh Atas - Karet Sudirman 1 - Bundaran Senayan - Gelora Bung Karno - Dukuh Atas 4 - Plaza Indonesia - Museum Nasional - SD Santa Maria - Pasar Baru - Juanda)
 BW5 - RPTRA Kalijodo (IRTI - Balai Kota - Sarinah - Tosari - RPTRA Kalijodo - Tosari - Plaza Indonesia - Sarinah - IRTI)
 BW6 - Priok Cemetery (Juanda - Monas 1 - Monas 2 - Monas 3 - IRTI - Balai Kota - Sarinah - Tosari - Makam Mbah Priok - Tosari - Plaza Indonesia - Museum Nasional - Pasar Baru - Juanda)
 BW7 - Jakarta Shopping (IRTI - Balai Kota - Sarinah - Tosari - Dukuh Atas 3 - Gelora Bung Karno North - Gelora Bung Karno 3 (Gate 1) - Plaza Indonesia - Senayan City - Gelora Bung Karno 2 - Dukuh Atas 4 - Tosari - Grand Indonesia - Sarinah - IRTI)

Inactive feeder routes

Kopaja AC

The routes are:
 Kopaja P.20 (Lebak Bulus - Senen), became corridor 6H
 Kopaja S.13 (Ragunan Belakang - Grogol)
 Kopaja S.602 (Ragunan - National Monument), became corridor 6B
 Kopaja U.31 (Kelapa Gading - Kota)

APTB (Busway Integrated Cross-Border Transport)
On January 24, 2014, there are 143 APTB buses.
But starting on June 1, 2016, APTBs are totally prohibited to enter busway corridors due to APTB frequently use non-busway corridors and still collect money from passengers whom enter APTB from TransJakarta buses stop. It is to follow March 5, 2016 policy that the policy is not so firm.

(APTB 01) Bekasi-Pulogadung Terminal TransJakarta FeederOn March 28, 2012, Bekasi TransJakarta Feeder began serving from Bekasi Bus Station to Pulo Gadung Bus Station, and vice versa through Jakarta–Cikampek Toll Road.
After temporarily halted operation since March 29, the feeder has hit the road again since April 21 with new route: Bekasi Terminal - Cut Meutia Street - Ahmad Yani Street - West Bekasi Toll Gate Bekasi - Jakarta Toll Road - Jakarta Inner Ring Toll Road - Perintis Kemerdekaan Street – Pulomas - Pulo Gadung Terminal

From September 17, 2012, APTB 01 integrates with two TransJakarta corridors. The haltes are:
Corridor 10: Pedati Prumpung - Jatinegara Station - Bea Cukai Ahmad Yani - Utan Kayu Rawamangun - Pemuda - Kayu Putih Rawasari - Pulomas Bypass
Corridor 2 : Bekasi Terminal - Cempaka Putih - Pedongkelan - ASMI - Pulomas - Bermis - Pulo Gadung Terminal

(APTB 02) Bekasi-Kampung Rambutan Terminal TransJakarta Feeder
The feeder will be integrated with TransJakarta Corridor 7.

(APTB 03) Poris Plawad–Tomang TransJakarta Feeder
On June 20, 2012, Poris Plawad–Tomang (East Tangerang) TransJakarta Feeder began serving from Poris Plawad Tangerang Bus Station to Kali Deres Bus Station vice versa.
The bus runs every 10 minutes and after one month operation the passengers is still around 2 to 5 persons only.

(APTB 04) Ciputat-Kota Bus Terminal TransJakarta Feeder
On October 4, 2012, South Tangerang TransJakarta Feeder began serving from Ciputat Bus Station to Kota Bus Terminal vice versa through: Ciputat - Pasar Jumat - Lebak Bulus - Metro Pondok Indah - Radio Dalam - Panglima Polim – Sisingamangaraja – Sudirman – Thamrin - Medan Merdeka Barat - Mangga Dua Raya

(APTB 05) Cibinong-Grogol Terminal TransJakarta Feeder
On December 7, 2012, Cibinong TransJakarta Feeder begun serve from Cibinong Bus Station to Grogol Terminal vice versa through:
 All stations in TransJakarta Corridor 9 (Sutoyo BKN, Cawang UKI, BNN until Grogol)
 Transit to TransJakarta Corridors 7 and 10 can be done at Stations Sutoyo BKN and Cawang UKI

(APTB 06) Bogor-Rawamangun Terminal TransJakarta Feeder
On March 6, 2013, Bogor TransJakarta Feeder begun serve from Bogor Bus Station to Rawamangun Terminal (APTB 06) vice versa and cross TransJakarta Corridor 4 (Pulo Gadung–Dukuh Atas) and Corridor 9 (Pinang Ranti–Pluit).

(APTB 07) Bekasi-Tanah Abang TransJakarta Feeder
On May 21, 2013, Bekasi–Tanah Abang TransJakarta Feeder began serving from Bekasi Bus Station to Tanah Abang Bus Station vice versa through Juanda street, Joyomartono, Jakarta-Cikampek Toll Road, Inner Ring Toll Road, Semanggi, Sudirman, Thamrin, Kebon Sirih, Fachrudin, Jati Baru and then turn at under Jati Baru Fly Over.

(APTB 08) Bekasi-Bundaran HI TransJakarta Feeder
On May 21, 2013, Bekasi–HI Circle (Bundaran HI) TransJakarta Feeder begun serve from Bekasi Bus Station to HI Circle vice versa through Juanda street, Joyomartono, Jakarta-Cikampek Toll Road, Inner Ring Toll Road, Gatot Subroto, Semanggi, Sudirman and HI Circle.

(APTB 09) Bogor-Blok M Terminal TransJakarta Feeder

(APTB 10) Cileungsi-Blok M Terminal TransJakarta Feeder

(APTB 11) Bogor-Tanah Abang TransJakarta Feeder

(APTB 12) Bogor-Tanjung Priok TransJakarta Feeder

(APTB 13) Poris Plawad–Pulogadung TransJakarta Feeder
On December 27, 2013, Poris Plawad–Pulogadung (East Tangerang) TransJakarta Feeder began serving as replacement of Patas AC 115.

(APTB 14) Cikarang-Kalideres Terminal TransJakarta Feeder
On January 24, 2014, Cikarang TransJakarta Feeder begun serve from Cikarang Bus Station to Kalideres Terminal vice versa.

Cross-Border Feeder
Starting on September 7, 2015, an route is Depok-Grogol (Depok Bus Terminal, Margonda street, Juanda street, Cijago Toll Road and exit at UKI Cawang and then use TransJakarta Corridor from Cilitan to Grogol). Due to four bus shelters at Margonda street and ten bus shelters at Juanda street not being finished, all passengers should exit at Depok Bus Terminal.
The closed routes are:
 Ciputat - Blok M (CLOSED)
 Harapan Indah - Pasar Baru (CLOSED)
 Poris Plawad - Kemayoran (CLOSED)
 Depok - Grogol (CLOSED)

Bus Terminal Feeder
Starting 1 February 2017, Badan Pengelola Trans Jabodetabek (BPTJ) operates 4 new feeder routes from and to 4 terminals throughout Jakarta to Pulo Gebang terminal. The aim of this feeder service is to give intercity bus passengers ease to get to the bus terminal.
 Corridor 11C Tanjung Priok - Pulo Gebang (CLOSED), 11C became Rusun Pinus Elok-Rusun Pulo Gebang (Rental Apartment feeder)
 Corridor 11E Lebak Bulus - Pulo Gebang (CLOSED)
 Corridor 11F Pasar Minggu - Pulo Gebang (CLOSED)
 Corridor 11H Pinang Ranti - Pulo Gebang (CLOSED)

TransJakarta-KWK Feeder
Some renovation KWK with TransJakarta sticker in front of KWK vehicles have served as TransJakarta-KWK Feeder with schedule 05.00-09.00 and 16.00-20.00. The blue color integration card of TransJakarta-KWK price is Rp 15,000 for a month, while TransJakarta card or is called e-ticket has brown color.
The integrated routes are :
 B03 Meruya-Grogol
 B08 Indosiar - Rawa Buaya 
 S14 Petukangan Utara - Lebak Bulus
 T03 Arundina - Rumah Sakit Harapan Bunda
 T07 Condet - Cililitan
 T24 Poncol - Rawamangun
 T31 Pejuang Jaya - Harapan Indah
 U03 Terminal Pulogebang - Tanjung Priok 
 U04 Kelapa Gading - Terminal Rawamangun
 U05 Tanjung Priok - Bulak Turi

Integration contract with KWK feeder ends on December 31, 2017.

See also

 TransJakarta
 List of free public transport routes (Worldwide)
 Free public transport
 Transport in Indonesia
 Rail transport in Indonesia

References

External links
 Official website
 Transjakarta map

Jakarta
Jakarta
Indonesia transport-related lists